There are currently eight active electricity interconnectors operating in the United Kingdom. They have a total capacity of 8.4 GW. A further seven interconnectors with a capacity of 11.1 GW are proposed or under construction, bringing the total potential capacity to 19.5 GW.

The rise of UK interconnection  

During 2021 interconnectors provided 28TWh of electricity to the UK, which equates to 10% of total demand, whilst in 2009 this figure was 7TWh.

Interconnectors allow the trade of electricity between countries with excess renewable generation and those with high demand. Interconnectors play a key part in balancing variable renewable generation, for example the North Sea Link allows the UK to export excess power to Norway during windy periods to conserve Norwegian hydro stocks and import Norwegian hydro power on less windy days.

During 2022 the UK exported record amounts of power to mainland Europe, helping to alleviate the effects of the war in Ukraine on European security of supply.

List of interconnectors

See also
 List of active coal fired power stations in the United Kingdom
 List of active gas fired power stations in the United Kingdom

References 

Electric power infrastructure in the United Kingdom
electricity interconnectors